The wristpack or wrist pack is a fanny pack worn on the wrist. It was popular in the early 1980s. The item was designed for runners and cyclists to use as a wrist wallet for their keys and money while performing physical activities.

The wristpack became popular amongst children and teenagers, and was available in an array of colors and designs. A southern California company named IMUNE claims they were the first makers of the wristpack in 1983, though it is hard to pinpoint its first reference in popular culture.

Bags (fashion)